Al Badil Al Taharouri (Arabic: البديل التحرّري, The Anarchist Alternative) is a Lebanese anarchist organization.  It is linked to the French anarchist group Alternative libertaire. Another name commonly used is Al Badil Al Chouyouii Al Taharouri (The Anarcho-Communist Alternative) or Alternative Communiste Libertaire.

See also
 Alternative libertaire

References

Anarchism in the Arab world
Anarchist organizations in Asia
Defunct platformist organizations